Wheatland is a census-designated place (CDP) in Cass County, North Dakota, United States. The population was 68 at the 2010 census.

History
A post office called Wheatland has been in operation since 1878. The community was named for the wheat field near the original town site.

Geography
Wheatland is located at  (46.907252, -97.349037).

Demographics

As of the census of 2000, there were 60 people, 22 households, and 17 families residing in the CDP. The population density was 15.0 people per square mile (5.8/km). There were 28 housing units at an average density of 7.0/sq mi (2.7/km). The racial makeup of the CDP was 100.00% White.

Out of the 22 households, 45.5% had children under the age of 18 living with them, 68.2% were married couples living together, 13.6% had a female householder with no husband present, and 18.2% were non-families. 18.2% of all households were made up of individuals, and 4.5% had someone living alone who was 65 years of age or older. The average household size was 2.73 and the average family size was 3.11.

In the CDP, the population was spread out, with 33.3% under the age of 18, 8.3% from 18 to 24, 21.7% from 25 to 44, 28.3% from 45 to 64, and 8.3% who were 65 years of age or older. The median age was 36 years. For every 100 females, there were 122.2 males. For every 100 females age 18 and over, there were 100.0 males.

The median income for a household in the CDP was $37,083, and the median income for a family was $55,625. Males had a median income of $35,000 versus $14,000 for females. The per capita income for the CDP was $16,084. None of the population and none of the families were below the poverty line.

References

External links
 Wheatland Centennial, 1879-1979 from the Digital Horizons website

Census-designated places in Cass County, North Dakota
Census-designated places in North Dakota